Hofstenia, or panther worms, is a genus of worms belonging to the family Hofsteniidae.

Species:

Hofstenia arabiensis 
Hofstenia atroviridis 
Hofstenia beltagii 
Hofstenia miamia 
Hofstenia minuta

References

Acoelomorphs